The District of Pavia was one of the four divisions of the , the province of Milan during the Napoleonic Italian Republic. It received the numeral II and its capital was Pavia.

The district
Founded on May 13, 1801, it had a population of 119,105 inhabitants. 

It was composed by the communes of: 
 
 Pavia
 Belgioioso
 Santa Margherita
 Albuzzano
 Butirrago
 Montesano
 Vigulfo
 Filighera
 Linarolo
 Spessa e Spessetta Balbiani
 Torre de' Negri
 Barona
 Carpignano con Strazzago
 VImanone
 Cà de' Tedioli
 Fossarmato
 Calignano
 Ceranova
 Lardirago
 Marzano
 Roncaro
 Sant'Alessio
 Vialone
 Spirago
 Vistarino
 Vivente
 Vaccarizza
 Valle Salimbene
 Belvedere
 Motta San Damiano
 Cà della Terra
 Prado
 Cantugno
 Mirabello
 Borgarello
 Comairano
 Ponte Carate
 San Genesio
 Torre del Mangano
 Bornasco
 Corbesate
 Misano
 Settimo
 Villareggio
 Zeccone
 Genzone
 Chignolo con Alberone e Botterone
 Corteolona
 Costa San Zenone
 Santa Cristina
 San Zenone
 Zerbo
 Badia
 Bissone
 Nizzolaro con Bolterone
 Campo Rinaldo
 Mezzano Parpanese
 Pieve Porto Morone
 Conticelli con Gabbiano e Mezzana
 Cantonale
 Binasco
 Badile
 Moirago
 Bubbiano
 Casarile
 Zavenasco
 Pasturago
 Liconasco
 Basilica Bologna
 Ronchetto con Cassina Scaccabarozzi
 Villarasca
 Casirate
 Mettone
 Lacchiarella
 Mandrugno
 Viano
 San Novo
 Zibido San Giacomo
 Vigonzino
 San Pietro Cusico
 Vernate
 Barate
 Copiago
 Moncucco
 Coazzano
 Conigo
 Tainate
 Noviglio
 Gudo Visconti
 Rosate
 Vigano
 Zelo
 Rognano
 Soncino
 Giussago
 Casatico
 Giovenzano
 Quinzano
 Carpignago
 Abbiategrasso
 Bugo
 Ozzero
 Robecco con Casterno
 Gaggiano
 Bonirola
 Lugagnano
 Caselle
 Ticinello
 Vermezzo
 Castelletto con Mendosio
 Bereguardo
 Pissarello
 Marcignago
 Origioso
 Velezzo
 San Perone
 Battuda
 Torriano
 Torrino e Torradello
 Trivolzio
 Casorate
 Calvignasco
 Papiago
 Trovo
 Zelada
 Cassina Calderara
 Montebello
 Villalunga
 Cassina de' Serigari
 Molinazzo
 Torre d'Isola
 Santa Sofia
 Cassina de' Tolentini
 San Varese
 Motta Visconti
 Besate
 Fallavecchia
 Basiano
 Coronate con Morimondo
 Genzago
 Inverno
 Copiano
 Magherno
 Monteleone
 Torre d'Arese
 Villanterio
 Siccomario
 con le ville di Costa Cavagliana
 Gere con Chiozzo
 Rato de Rea
 Mezzanino
 Mezzana d'Ancorbate
 Mezzano Corti
 Mezzana con Cassina Lebba in Mezzano
 San martino
 Santa Maria della Strada con Torre de' Cani
 Santa Maria Travaccio con Cassina Lebba
 Valbona
 Verrua
 Sommo
 Zibido al Lambro
 Cavagnera
 Mandrino
 Cassina Bianca
 Landriano
 Vidigulfo
 Vairano
 Pontelungo
 Gnignano con Siziano
 Villamaggiore
 Gualdrasco
 Campomorto
 La Cava
 Campomaggiore con Sabbione
 San Fedele con Truvido.

Sources
 Historical database of Lombard laws (it.)

Former departments of France in Italy
Pavia
History of Lombardy
Kingdom of Italy (Napoleonic)